Jaakko Juuti (born 13 August 1987) is a Finnish professional footballer, who plays as a midfielder for Finnish premier division club Ilves.

References

External links
 

1987 births
Living people
Finnish footballers
Association football midfielders
FC Haka players
FC Hämeenlinna players
FC Ilves players
People from Kajaani
Sportspeople from Kainuu